Bikram: Yogi, Guru, Predator is a 2019 documentary film directed by Eva Orner and starring Larissa Anderson, Francesca Asumah and Sarah Baughn. The premise revolves around Bikram Choudhury and how he built his yoga business.

The film premiered at the 2019 Toronto International Film Festival, and released on Netflix on November 20, 2019.

Cast 
 Larissa Anderson
 Francesca Asumah
 Sarah Baughn
 Bikram Choudhury
 John Dowd
 Ann Duong
 Mukul Dutta
 Micki Jafa-Bodden
 Carla Minnard
 Richard Nixon
 Mark Quigley
 Val Sklar Robinson
 Mandeep Kaur Sandhu
 Jakob Schanzer
 Patrice Simon

Release
Bikram: Yogi, Guru, Predator was released on November 20, 2019, on Netflix.

Reception
On Rotten Tomatoes, the film holds an approval rating of 96% based on 24 reviews, with an average rating of 6.80/10.

References

External links
 
 

2019 documentary films
2019 films
Netflix original documentary films
2010s English-language films